Srisailam is a census town in Nandyal district of the Indian state of Andhra Pradesh. It is the mandal headquarters of Srisailam mandal in Atmakur revenue division. The town is famous for Mallikarjuna Jyotirlinga Temple and is one of the holy pilgrimage sites for Saivism and Shaktism sects of Hinduism. The town is classified as both Jyotirlinga and Shakti Peetha.

 India census, Srisailam had a population of 23,257. Males constituted 54% of the population and females 46%. Srisailam Project (RFC) Township has an average literacy rate of 75.62% higher than the state average of 67.02%. Male literacy is around 85.68% while female literacy rate is 63.24%. 13% of the population is under 6 years of age.

Tourism 

Srisailam is one of the popular tourist destinations in Andhra Pradesh and considered one of the most important pilgrimage centres of Lord Shiva.
Srisailam Dam which was built over Krishna river is one of the largest dams in South India.
Nagarjunsagar-Srisailam Tiger Reserve, India's largest tiger reserve is spread over 3500 km2. This Sanctuary is a natural habitat of diverse species of flora and fauna. The lush and dense Nallamala Forest range is a popular destination for trekking, hill climbing, forest exploration and research, to which Srisailam town acts as a base camp.
Mallikarjuna Jyotirlinga enshrines Lord Mallikarjuna and is an ancient temple built in a Dravidian style with specimens showcasing the Vijayanagara architecture.
Akka Mahadevi Caves, Pathalaganga, Shikareshwara Temple are few other attractions in this place.
Siddi Ramappa Kolanu waterfalls located at Srisailam Half Kilo Meter Distance from Main Temple.

Education 
The primary and secondary school education is imparted by government, aided and private schools, under the School Education Department of the state.

Transport 
The Andhra Pradesh State Road Transport Corporation operates bus services from Srisailam and Atmakur bus station with Atmakur bus depot.

By Foot

There is a path to travel on foot from Atmakur to Srisailam. The Devotees to fulfil their Vow to Lord Shiva will take this path to reach Srisailam on foot from Atmakur. The path completely passes through dense forest of Nallamala Hills. One has to carry their own food and Potable items with them as there are no adequate facilities. This path for devotees is allowed only twice in a year viz.,

 Maha Shivaratri
 Ugadi

Road

There are two roads to reach Srisailam as it can be accessed by road from Dornala and Atchampet. The state government-owned Andhra Pradesh State Road Transport Corporation (APSRTC) operates frequent buses from Atmakur and Dornala and also from nearby places.

Rail

The nearest railway station is at Markapur Road Railway Station, about 90 kilometres from Srisailam. Markapur Road railway station in the South Central Railway zone of the Indian Railways. It is under the jurisdiction of Guntur Railway Division.

Airport

The nearest airport is Kurnool Airport about 180 kilometres from Srisailam. It is a domestic airport.

References 

Cities and towns in Nandyal district
Company towns in India